The Canon was a weekly audio podcast on Earwolf which began airing on November 3, 2014 and ended on July 16, 2018. Each week Devin Faraci and Amy Nicholson, of MTV News, discussed films they believed to be worthy of The Canon. The Canon is a list of films that the audience votes to decide whether it is one of "the greatest films of all time", similar to the Western Canon. Some episodes compare two films head-to-head.

Due to an allegation brought against Faraci of sexual assault, Nicholson and Earwolf mutually agreed to put the podcast on an indefinite hiatus. Nicholson appeared on an episode of fellow Earwolf podcast Denzel Washington Is The Greatest Actor of All Time Period and confirmed that she would be bringing back The Canon in "early spring" 2017. In an announcement on April 10, 2017, Amy said Devin "won't be coming back for this version" but that "when and if he is ready to come back, the door is open." The Canon returned on April 17, 2017, featuring Nicholson and a different co-host for every episode.

Format
At the beginning of the podcast, Devin Faraci and Amy Nicholson tell whether last week's film was voted to be added to The Canon. They then introduce the film of the week, typically with some background information and a brief bit on the film. For the rest of the podcast, Devin and Amy discuss whether the film should be in The Canon; typically, the hosts pick opposite positions on its being added. After the podcast, listeners can go and vote on the film's being included in The Canon, on The Canon forum.

Episodes

References

External links
 

Audio podcasts
Film and television podcasts
Earwolf
2014 podcast debuts
2018 podcast endings
American podcasts